James Terrell (born April 20, 1965) is an American sprint canoer who competed from the late 1980s to the mid-1990s. He was eliminated in the semifinals of the C-1 500 m event at the 1988 Summer Olympics in Seoul. Four years later in Barcelona, Terrell was eliminated in the semifinals of the C-2 500 m event. At his third and final Summer Olympics in Atlanta, Terrell was eliminated in the semifinals of the C-1 500 m event.

References
Sports-Reference.com profile

1965 births
American male canoeists
Canoeists at the 1988 Summer Olympics
Canoeists at the 1992 Summer Olympics
Canoeists at the 1996 Summer Olympics
Living people
Olympic canoeists of the United States
Pan American Games medalists in canoeing
Pan American Games gold medalists for the United States
Pan American Games bronze medalists for the United States
Canoeists at the 1987 Pan American Games
Canoeists at the 1995 Pan American Games
Canoeists at the 1999 Pan American Games
Medalists at the 1995 Pan American Games
Medalists at the 1999 Pan American Games